Siguang Ri is a mountain in the Mahalangur Himalayas of Tibet, China. At an elevation of  it is the 83rd highest peak on Earth. It is located approximately 6 kilometers NNE of Cho Oyu, the world's 6th highest mountain.

Siguang Ri has two significant subpeaks:

Siguang Ri Shar  (6998m, Prominence = 398m)
Siguang Ri Northwest  (6840m, Prominence = 340m)

References

Mountains of Tibet
Seven-thousanders of the Himalayas